Totectors are a British brand of safety footwear, and other workwear, notably steel toe-capped boots and shoes.

B. Denton and Son, the original manufacturer, was founded in the nineteenth century, but the steel toecaps were the result of war-work. In World War II, many new recruits to the coal industry were suffering foot injuries. George Denton travelled to the US in 1944 to secure the rights to the patented steel toecap from Arthur Williams.

Totectors Ltd were dissolved in 2014.

References

British brands
Protective gear